Nymphicula samoensis is a moth in the family Crambidae. It was described by David John Lawrence Agassiz in 2014. It is found on Samoa.

References

Nymphicula
Moths described in 2014